The Chernytskyi waterfall is located on the Chernyk river in Chernyk village, Nadvirna Raion, Ivano-Frankivsk Oblast.

See also
 Waterfalls of Ukraine

External links
 www.turystam.in.ua

References 

Waterfalls of Ukraine